Přílepy is a municipality and village in Kroměříž District in the Zlín Region of the Czech Republic. It has about 1,000 inhabitants.

Notable people
Bohumil Páník (born 1956), football manager
Antonín Koláček (born 1959), entrepreneur
Zdeněk Grygera (born 1980), footballer

References

Villages in Kroměříž District